Nisshin-Ko Dam  is an earthfill dam located in Hokkaido Prefecture in Japan. The dam is used for irrigation. The catchment area of the dam is 2.9 km2. The dam impounds about 9  ha of land when full and can store 842 thousand cubic meters of water. The construction of the dam was completed in 1924.

References

Dams in Hokkaido